The Tiananmen Mothers is a group of Chinese democracy activists promoting a change in the government's position over the 1989 Tiananmen Square protests and massacre. It is led by Ding Zilin, a retired university professor whose teenage son was shot and killed by government troops during the protests. The group – comprising the parents, friends and relatives of victims of the massacre – formed in September 1989 when Ding, along with her husband Jiang Peikun, met another mother, Zhang Xianling, whose 19-year-old son was also killed on June 4, 1989. As well as campaigning, the group also disseminates information about the events to the public, including through the internet. Currently, the group consists of relatives of 125 individuals killed during the protests. For her efforts, Ding has been hailed as an "advocate for the dead".

Background
A large group of Beijing-based student activists (along with nearby people) were shot on the orders of Deng Xiaoping, then a chief military commander of the People's Liberation Army. This happened during the summer of 1989, centered around sunset in the evening on June 4. Beijing medical doctors from the very beginning recall critically injured patients being carried into hospitals of nearly all specialties, throughout the night continuing into noon.

Formation

Prior to June 1989, Ding Zilin was a Philosophy professor at the People's University and a member of the Chinese Communist Party (CCP). On June 3, 1989, her 17-year-old son Jiang Jielian was killed on his way to Tiananmen Square. Ding launched a one-woman campaign to establish what had happened to her son and those who were killed that night. The government had put her under surveillance and Ding experienced harassment as she met with other victims families. Describing the organisation, Ding announced that the group were "a common group of citizens brought together by a shared fate and suffering".

Despite the expansion of the group, many Chinese intellectuals had kept away from the movement, as they did with the Democracy Wall movement in the late 1970s. One exception was Wu Zuguang, who advocated a reversal of the governments position at a meeting of the Chinese People's Political Consultative Conference in 1997, and he did not suffer any repercussions for his comments because of his age. Other members of the group included prominent student Jiang Qisheng, a graduate of the Beijing Institute of Aeronautics who became head of the Beijing Student Autonomous Federation which acted in conjunction with other universities and formed part of a delegation that met with Chinese Premier Li Peng to try and resolve the Tiananmen protests peacefully. He was jailed for 18 months and upon his release in February 1991, was denied regular employment.

Further promoting their campaign, members of the Tiananmen Mothers sought to gain the attention of the international media. In a May 1991 interview with ABC, Ding and Zhang Xianling condemned the actions of the Chinese government and in particular Premier Li Peng who claimed that the crackdown was necessary in order to maintain social stability. She also called on people of conscience not to forget those who had lost their lives. Three years later in 1994, and on the fifth anniversary of the crackdown, Ding published The Factual Account of a Search for the June 4 Victims listing 96 individuals who had been killed. By the tenth anniversary on June 4, 1999, she had reported 155 deaths and 65 who were injured but noted that these were "only the tip of the iceberg... but at least it is visible."

Ding's regular public campaigning, including public petitions and lawsuits against the government, saw her expelled from the party in May 1992, and both Ding and her husband, also a professor at the university, were forced into retirement in 1993. The Tiananmen Mothers movement has also inspired other families of political prisoners to campaign for their release. Since then, a few dozen families meet together regularly on every anniversary of the crackdown, despite government intimidation. Ding and other members have occasionally been detained by authorities as a result of their actions.

Campaign

Demands
The Chinese government currently views the protests as a "counterrevolutionary uprising". The Tiananmen Mothers group, which was conducted without official approval, put forward a five-point demand to the Chinese government in relation to the protest:

The right to mourn peacefully in public;
The right to accept humanitarian aid from organizations and individuals inside and outside China;
No more persecution of victims, including those injured in the shootings and the families of the dead;
The release of all people still in prison for their role in the 1989 protests; and
A full, public investigation into the crackdown

The group also wants the Chinese government to name the dead, compensate families and punish those responsible. The government made a payout of 70,000 yuan for the first time in 2006 to one of the victims families. The move was welcomed by Zilin, though she said it was unlikely to indicate a change in the government's position.

Public appeals
The Tiananmen Mothers have made many public appeals, challenging the government. They protested to the National People's Congress, the Chinese People's Political Consultative Conference, the judiciary and the population. The group has also opened up contacts with UN Human Rights Council and foreign media, issuing a video demanding the government reassess Tiananmen. On the tenth anniversary, despite memories of the event fading due to strong government censorship, Jiang Qisheng, who had since been released, drafted a letter along with fifteen others appealing for quiet commemoration by lighting candles in cities across China. He played a major role in organising the event, posting flyers on lampposts calling on the population to "light a myriad of candles to collectively commemorate the brave spirits of June Fourth" and as a result, several petitions to hold protest were submitted, but were rejected by government authorities. Jiang was arrested on shortly before the anniversary; in court on November 1, 1999, he defended himself, maintaining he was exercising freedom of speech and recalling a previous reversal of the government's term "counterrevolutionary" after the Gang of Four and Cultural Revolution. He urged the government not to imprison people for expressing their views, "Simply by writing and talking, do I commit such a crime against heaven that I must be put to death?" and his lawyer, Mao Shaoping argued that the group's activities did not amount to "subversion of state power". Jiang was charged and released from prison on May 19, 2003.

Despite Jiang's arrest, Ding remained undeterred. On June 4, 1999, the group presented a petition signed by 108 relatives to the Supreme People's Procuratorate, asking for a legal ruling on the deaths of the protestors. The petition contained evidence they had collected including testimonies and names of the dead and injured. They asserted that they were exercising their political rights, and not engaging in any illegal activities. The movement still continues, receiving warnings not to commemorate and undergoing increased surveillance around June 3–4 every year. An increasing number of dissidents and former intellectuals from the party, including Hu Yaobang's former secretary and Huang Qi have joined the group, and have been expelled from the establishment as a result.

In 2009, the organisation urged the government to "break the taboo" surrounding the incident. The Tiananmen Mothers website is blocked by internet censors in China.

Analysts say pressure by groups like the Tiananmen Mothers may eventually lead to some acknowledgment of the deaths during the crackdown, such as a plaque placed on the square, but most agree that will not come soon.

Arrests
Ding Zilin, Zhang Xianling, who lost her 19-year-old son, and Huang Jinping, who lost her 30-year-old husband were detained in March 2004. Authorities first denied the arrests, but later said they had been detained for engaging in what were described as illegal activities sponsored by overseas forces. They were released later in the week but remained under close surveillance in the run-up to the 15th anniversary of the protests.

The women have been under what advocates describe as house arrest. All their calls are monitored and they are told not to talk to other activists, with foreign media, and with human rights organizations.

Newspaper advert controversy
On June 4, 2007, the Chengdu Evening News ran a one-page line commemorating the Tiananmen Mothers, stating, "Saluting the strong mothers of June 4th victims." Officials at the newspaper refused to answer questions regarding the advert. It was later suggested that the person who ran the advert was unaware of the significance of 6/4, instead being told it was related to a mining disaster that took place. Three editors were later fired from the paper.

See also
Black Sash
Human rights in the People's Republic of China
Mothers of the Plaza de Mayo
Women in Black
Ladies in White
Women's roles during the 1989 Tiananmen Square protests and massacre

References

Bibliography

Books
Carrabine, Eamon; Cox, Pamela; Lee, Maggy; South, Nigel & Plummer, Ken (2009). "Victim movements - examples from around the world" in Criminology: A Sociological Introduction. Taylor & Francis. .
Goldman, Merle. (2005). From Comrade to Citizen: The Struggle for Political Rights in China. Harvard University Press. .
Peerenboom, Randall. (2007). China modernizes: threat to the West or model for the rest? Oxford University Press. .
Stichele, Caroline & Penner, Todd. (2005). Her Master's Tools?: Feminist and Postcolonial Engagements of Historical-critical Discourse. Society of Biblical Literature. .
Tai, Zixue. (2006). The Internet in China: Cyberspace and Civil Society. CRC Press. .

News reports
Chengdu Evening News editors fired over Tiananmen ad, Reuters, June 7, 2007.
China makes 1989 Tiananmen payout, BBC News, April 30, 2006.
China told to end Tiananmen taboo, BBC News, February 27, 2009.
Human Rights Defender, Ding Zilin, under house arrest in China, Human Rights Defenders, July 6, 2004.
Fifteenth Anniversary of the Tiananmen Square Massacre, Wordpress.org, June 4, 2004.
Mother Courage, TIME, April 5, 2004.
Newspaper Ad Salutes Tiananmen Mothers, Washington Post, June 7, 2007.
Tiananmen mothers press for answers, Vancouver Sun, June 4, 2008.

External links
Tianananmen Mothers—official homepage of the group
Tiananmen Mothers Campaign—homepage of the Hong Kong-based support group
'Tiananmen Mothers' Continue Quest for Justice
HRIC Statement: Chinese authorities should respond to calls for dialogue by the Tiananmen Mothers
Testimonies from the Tiananmen Mothers and other relatives of the killed and wounded

1989 Tiananmen Square protests and massacre
Women's organizations based in China
Political movements
Chinese human rights activists
Chinese democracy movements
Women human rights activists